Hillie Molenaar (born 22 May 1945, Sneek) is a Dutch documentary film director.

She left school at 15 and worked as a cleaner, waitress, and bookkeeper before finding her niche as a documentary filmmaker in 1974 when, at the age of 29, she made her first film Protest Garden. She was assistant to the legendary Joris Ivens before she formed Molenwiek Film with Joop van Wijk in 1978. Jointly they have produced and directed a dozen award winning documentaries and short films including The Factory (1979) and The Daily Nation (2000). They also produced Xime (Guinea-Bissau, 1994) directed by Sana Na N’Hada, which was an official selection at Cannes Film Festival in Un Certain Regard.

She has since formed her own production company HM Films, and teaches with the Zelig School for Documentary, Television and New Media.

Filmography

Directorial

Films 
The Factory (1979)
Isingiro Hospital (1993)
Crossroads (1997)
The Daily Nation (2000)

References

External links

1945 births
Living people
Dutch documentary filmmakers
Dutch documentary film directors
Dutch documentary film producers
Dutch women film directors
Golden Calf winners
People from Sneek
Women documentary filmmakers